Edaicode  is a panchayat town in Kanniyakumari district  in the state of Tamil Nadu, India.

Demographics
 India census, Edaicode had a population of 23,320. Males constitute 49% of the population and females 51%. Edaicode has an average literacy rate of 78%, higher than the national average of 59.5%: male literacy is 82%, and female literacy is 75%. In Edaicode, 10% of the population is under 6 years of age.

In Edaicode there is a 24/7 Public Health Centre (PHC).

See also
Alappancode Easwara Kala Bhoothathan Temple

References

Cities and towns in Kanyakumari district